Forget may refer to:

 Forgetting, an apparent loss or modification of information already encoded and stored in an individual's long-term memory

People with the surname 
Nota bene: this surname is pronounced fɔʁʒɛ in French, and is not to be confused with the English verb fɔɹˈɡɛt.

 Amédée E. Forget (1847–1923), Canadian lawyer and politician
 Claude Forget (born 1936), Canadian politician
 Guy Forget (born 1965), former French tennis player
 Joachim Son-Forget (born 1983), South Korean-born French politician
 Louis-Joseph Forget (1853–1911), Canadian businessman and politician
 Maud Forget (born 1982), French actress
 Michel Forget (born 1942), Canadian actor
 Michel Forget (1927–2020), French military pilot
 Monique Jérôme-Forget (born 1940), Canadian psychologist and politician
 Rodolphe Forget (1861–1919), Canadian business investor, stockbroker and politician

Places 
 Forget, Ontario, a community in Ontario, Canada
 Forget, Saskatchewan, a village in Saskatchewan, Canada
 Saint-Forget, a commune in the Yvelines department, in France
 Mount Forget, located on the border of Alberta and British Columbia

Media 
 "Forget", a song by 8stops7 from Birth of a Cynic
 "Forget", a song by Marina and the Diamonds from FROOT
 Forget (Twin Shadow album), 2010
 Forget (Xiu Xiu album), 2017
"Forget" (The Walking Dead), an episode of the television series The Walking Dead

See also
 Memory
 Distraction
 Procrastination

French-language surnames